José Vizcarra (born 8 August 1984 in Rosario) is an Argentine football forward for C.D. Águila in El Salvador.

Career 
Vizcarra played for the Rosario Central youth team until 2006 when he was loaned to Socio Águila Fútbol Club and then Club Zacatepec in Mexico, in 2007 he was loaned to LDU Quito.

In 2007 Vizcarra returned to Central, although the team had a very poor season finishing last in the Apertura 2007, Vizcarra had a productive season scoring 9 goals, making him the tournaments equal 5th top scorer. On 31 July 2009 Gimnasia y Esgrima have signed forward from Rosario Central on a joint ownership deal for a season. Now "El chino" is playing for a world-famous club called Ferro Carril Oeste from the world capital of soccer, Buenos Aires, Argentina, he is rivaling a bad player call Salmerón who is Horrible, we are waiting for his goals and expecting to go back on first division on 2016, he is our new idol. A club premiated by the UNESCO only with Milan from Italy  as best club in the world at any sport.

Footnotes

External links
 José Vizcarra at Football-Lineups
José Vizcarra – Argentine Primera statistics at Fútbol XXI 
 

1984 births
Living people
Footballers from Rosario, Santa Fe
Argentine people of Basque descent
Argentine footballers
Argentine expatriate footballers
Association football forwards
Club América footballers
L.D.U. Quito footballers
Rosario Central footballers
Deportivo Táchira F.C. players
Club de Gimnasia y Esgrima La Plata footballers
Rangers de Talca footballers
San Martín de San Juan footballers
Boca Unidos footballers
Club Atlético Platense footballers
CSyD Tristán Suárez footballers
C.D. Águila footballers
Chilean Primera División players
Argentine Primera División players
Liga MX players
Primera Nacional players
Primera B Metropolitana players
Torneo Federal A players
Venezuelan Primera División players
Argentine expatriate sportspeople in Chile
Argentine expatriate sportspeople in Mexico
Argentine expatriate sportspeople in Ecuador
Argentine expatriate sportspeople in Venezuela
Argentine expatriate sportspeople in El Salvador
Expatriate footballers in Chile
Expatriate footballers in Mexico
Expatriate footballers in Ecuador
Expatriate footballers in Venezuela
Expatriate footballers in El Salvador
Ferro Carril Oeste footballers